Shanghai Jinjiang Hotel (a.k.a. Jin Jiang Hotel) is a luxury hotel in Shanghai. The main part of the hotel comprises two early 20th century apartment buildings, set around two lawns. The hotel contains 515 guest rooms, which include both modern facilities and traditional furniture and decor. The hotel covers an area of about 30,000 square metres, of which 10,000 square metres are covered with green leisure space, flowers, and trees.

History
The current Jinjiang Hotel was converted from three buildings: the 13-storey Cathay Mansion apartment building completed in 1929, the 18-storey Grosvenor House apartment building completed in 1934, and a three-storey side wing of Grosvenor House. Both buildings were owned by Victor Sassoon's E.D. Sassoon and Company Limited. By the time the Communist Party of China liberated Shanghai in 1949, many of the residents had fled the city. According to records, by the end of 1949, of Grosvenor House's 77 apartments, only 12 were inhabited: 10 by foreigner households, and two Chinese.

The name "Jinjiang" derives from a restaurant opened in 1935 by female entrepreneur Dong Zhujun elsewhere in Shanghai. In 1951, the new government took over Cathay Mansion and converted it into a hotel for senior party officials and international visitors. Dong's restaurant moved into Cathay Mansion, the hotel was named "Jinjiang Hotel", and Dong became the hotel's first chairman.

Grosvenor House remained an apartment building, but in 1956 was confiscated by the government. Some of the apartments were allocated to Shanghai's prominent literati. These same residents were denounced and "swept out" in 1957 during the Anti-Rightist Movement. The building was then allocated to Jinjiang Hotel as well.

When President Nixon visited China, the American delegation stayed at this hotel, and the Shanghai Communiqué was signed there. Jinjiang Hotel was renovated in 1998.

The separate Jin Jiang Tower hotel is a high-rise hotel built one block from the original Jinjiang Hotel. It was built in 1988.

In March 2000, the Jinjiang Hotel was rated as a 5-star hotel rating by the National Tourism Bureau of China.
The hotel was renovated in 2004.

Awards and recognition
As a representative of the state of "Chinese culinary artistry", the hotel's cuisine was highly praised by a New York Times reporter, proving that the China's cuisine is returning to its "glory days".

The catering service department of Jinjiang Grand Hall gained the honor of “Advanced Group of National Travel Industry” and made a speech as the only representative from Shanghai (a total of six were chosen in China) in the Great Hall of the People in Beijing.

References

External links
 Jinjiang chains official website
 Jinjiang Inn chains official website
 

Hotel buildings completed in 1934
1934 establishments in China
Skyscraper hotels in Shanghai